"Que reste-t-il de nos amours ?" (What Remains of Our Loves?) is a French popular song, with music by Léo Chauliac and Charles Trenet and lyrics by Charles Trenet. A version of the song with English lyrics entitled "I Wish You Love" is recognizable by the opening line "I wish you bluebirds, in the spring".

History 
This song was first recorded by the French female singer Lucienne Boyer in 1942 (78 rpm, Columbia Records: BF 68). Second recorded by the French crooner Roland Gerbeau in February 1943 (78 rpm, Polydor Records: 524.830). Charles Trenet recorded his own version in July 1943 (78 rpm Columbia Records: DF 3116).

"I Wish You Love"
The song is best known to English-speaking audiences as  "I Wish You Love", with new lyrics by American composer and lyricist, Albert Askew Beach (1924-1997):
"I Wish You Love" was introduced in 1957 by Keely Smith as the title cut of her solo debut album, I Wish You Love, and was one of Smith's signature songs. Smith's debut album otherwise consisted of standards. She later recalled: "[when] we sat down to select the songs [the record producer] Voyle Gilmore...played a bunch of standards [then] said: 'I want to play you a really pretty French song [...] it won't mean nothing and you won't do it in the album but I just thought I'd play it for you' and he played 'I Wish You Love'. So, at the end of him playing all these songs [...] I said: 'Babe, I'll sing any 11 songs y'all want me to but I want to sing 'I Wish You Love'."

Other recordings
It has since become a musical standard, with many other recordings: 
Gloria Lynne's 1963 recording for the Everest label reached No. 28 on the Billboard Hot 100 in 1964 and the top ten on the Easy Listening chart, and #3 on Cashbox Magazine's R&B chart (Billboard did not publish standard R&B listings during 1964).
Dalida recorded the song in 1972.
Rony Verbiest recorded the song in 2001.
An Italian version entitled "Che cosa resta" was recorded by Franco Battiato in 1999.
An Arabic version entitled "Shou Byeb'a" was recorded by Carla Chamoun in 2020.

Other notable recordings

Use in film
The song was heard in several films:
It was used extensively in the François Truffaut film Stolen Kisses (1968), its French title, Baisers volés, having been taken from the song's lyrics. 
The song was also used in the films "Iris" (2001), "Something's Gotta Give" (2003), and "Ces amours-là" (2010).

References

External links
Song lyric

1940s jazz standards
1943 songs
Songs written by Charles Trenet
Lucienne Boyer songs
Charles Trenet songs
French songs
Pop standards